Capt. William George "Bay" Middleton (16 April 1846 – 9 April 1892) was a noted British horseman of the 19th century. He was equerry to John Spencer, 5th Earl Spencer, who was Lord Lieutenant of Ireland 1869–1874 and 1882–1885.

He was privately tutored at Wimbledon, gazetted to the 12th Lancers in 1865, and stationed in Cahir in County Tipperary. He rode his first Winning Race in 1867 at Cork Park. He joined the Lord Lieutenant's staff as an extra Aide de Camp in 1870, where he was based at the Viceregal Lodge in Dublin, was promoted to captain and left services. Middleton was one of the best and most popular riders in the United Kingdom. When the Empress of Austria hunted in Ireland, he was her pilot. He repeatedly rode the winners over the stiffest steeplechase courses, including the Punchestown (Ireland) Grand National. Besides being distinguished as a horseman, he was a good cricketer, belonging to the Jockey Cricket Club.

His nickname "Bay" was either a reference to his reddish-brown hair, or derived from the name of the winner of The Derby winner in 1836.

Personal life
William George Middleton was born at Barony, Glasgow, Lanarkshire, Scotland, the son of George Middleton and Mary Margaret Hamilton. He attended the Glasgow Academy. In 1875, Middleton became engaged to Charlotte Baird, daughter of William Baird, Esq. of Elie House, Elie, Fife, Scotland, whom he married on 25 October 1882, at St. George's, Hanover Square. The couple had one daughter, Violet Georgina, born in 1886.

The Empress Elisabeth of Austria visited England, arriving on 2 August 1874, where she met The Earl Spencer. When she returned to England in 1876, she visited Lord Spencer at Althorp, and Bay Middleton was asked to "pilot" the Empress. She left England in February 1882 and never hunted in England or Ireland again.

He had an 18-month affair with Lady (Henrietta) Blanche Ogilvy, while she was married to Colonel Henry Hozier. She confided in a letter (made public in August 2002 by her granddaughter, Mary Soames) to another lover that Bay Middleton was the father of her daughter, Clementine Hozier, born 1 April 1885, who was eventually to marry Sir Winston Churchill.

Another writer, Joan Hardwick, had speculated that Clementine had been fathered by Algernon Bertram Freeman-Mitford (1837-1916): Lady Soames dismissed such earlier speculation as "based on anecdote and gossip", which was, unlike the paternity of Middleton, undocumented.

Death
Captain William George Middleton died a week before his 46th birthday in the Midland Sportsman's Cup at Lord Willoughby de Broke's estate at Kineton, killed in a fall from his horse at the Parliamentary steeplechase. He was buried in full riding costume at Haselbech, Northamptonshire. His coffin was kept in the parish church, covered with the Union Jack and flanked with lances of the 12th Lancers, Captain Middleton's regiment. A large assembly of mourners gathered to attend the funeral service, which was conducted by the Rev. W. Lloyd, the rector. Among the mourners were the widow and the deceased's only (officially acknowledged) child, a little girl of six. Earl Spencer, Lord and Lady Willoughby de Broke, Sir Saville Crossley, M.P., Mr. Albert Pell, Captain Atherton, Mr. Charles. W. B. Fernie, General Le Quesne, and many others who were well known in the hunting field also attended Middleton's funeral.

Portrayal on stage
Middleton appears as the Empress's lover in Kenneth MacMillan's ballet Mayerling.

Middleton's courtship of Charlotte Baird and his relationship with the Empress are the focus of Daisy Goodwin's novel The Fortune Hunter.

References

The Times (of London), 15 April 1892, p. 7, col. E.
John Welcome, The Sporting Empress: The Story of Elizabeth of Austria and Bay Middleton, London: Michael Joseph, 1975.
Sigrid-Maria Größing: Sisi und ihre Männer. Moldenverlag.

1846 births
1892 deaths
English jockeys
Jockeys who died while racing
Sport deaths in England
12th Royal Lancers officers
English cricketers
Marylebone Cricket Club cricketers
I Zingari cricketers